Wong Pui Yi (born 31 May 1961) is a Hong Kong para table tennis player. She won a gold medal at the 1992 Summer Paralympics and two silver medals at the 1996 Summer Paralympics.

She was diagnosed with polio when she was one year old. She began playing in 1979.

References

1961 births
Living people
Hong Kong female table tennis players
Table tennis players at the 1988 Summer Paralympics
Table tennis players at the 1992 Summer Paralympics
Table tennis players at the 1996 Summer Paralympics
Table tennis players at the 2000 Summer Paralympics
Table tennis players at the 2008 Summer Paralympics
Table tennis players at the 2012 Summer Paralympics
Table tennis players at the 2016 Summer Paralympics
Paralympic medalists in table tennis
Paralympic gold medalists for Hong Kong
Paralympic silver medalists for Hong Kong
Medalists at the 1992 Summer Paralympics
Medalists at the 1996 Summer Paralympics
Paralympic table tennis players of Hong Kong
People with polio
Alumni of the Chinese University of Hong Kong
FESPIC Games competitors
20th-century Hong Kong women